The Army National Guard (ARNG), in conjunction with the Air National Guard, is an organized militia force and a federal military reserve force of the United States Army. They are simultaneously part of two different organizations: the Army National Guard of each state, most territories, and the District of Columbia (also referred to as the Militia of the United States), and the Army National Guard of the United States (as part of the federalized National Guard). The Army National Guard is divided into subordinate units stationed in each U.S. state and territory, as well as the District of Columbia, operating under their respective governors and governor-equivalents.

The foundation for what became the Army National Guard occurred in the city of Salem, Massachusetts, in 1636, the first time that a regiment of militia drilled for the common defense of a multi-community area.

Activation
The Army National Guard as currently authorized and organized operates under Title 10 of the United States Code when under federal control, and Title 32 of the United States Code and applicable state laws when under state control. The Army National Guard may be called up for active duty by the state or territorial governors to help respond to domestic emergencies and disasters, such as those caused by hurricanes, floods, and earthquakes, as well as civil disorder. The District of Columbia Army National Guard is a federal militia, controlled by the President of the United States with authority delegated to the Secretary of Defense, and through him to the Secretary of the Army.

Members or units of the Army National Guard may be ordered, temporarily or indefinitely, into the service of the United States. If mobilized for federal service, the member or unit becomes part of the Army National Guard of the United States, which is a reserve component of the United States Army. Individuals volunteering for active federal service may do so subject to the consent of their governors. Governors generally cannot veto involuntary activations of individuals or units for federal service, either for training or national emergency. (See Perpich v. Department of Defense.)

The President may also call up members and units of the Army National Guard, in its status as the militia of the several states, to repel invasion, suppress rebellion, or enforce federal laws. The Army National Guard of the United States is one of two organizations administered by the National Guard Bureau, the other being the Air National Guard of the United States.  The Director of the Army National Guard is the head of the organization, and reports to the Chief of the National Guard Bureau. Because the Army National Guard is both the militia of the several states and a federal reserve component of the Army, neither the Chief of the National Guard Bureau nor the Director of the Army National Guard "commands" it. This operational command authority is performed in each state or territory by the State Adjutant General, and in the District of Columbia by the Commanding General of the District of Columbia National Guard when a unit is in its militia status. While under federal activation, the operational command authority is transferred to the commanders of the unified combatant commands, who command all U.S. forces within their area of responsibility. The Chief of the National Guard Bureau and the Director of the Army National Guard serve as the channel of communications between the Department of the Army and the Army National Guard in each state and territory, and administer federal programs, policies, and resources for the National Guard.

The Army National Guard's portion of the president's proposed federal budget for Fiscal Year 2018 is approximately $16.2 billion to support an end strength of 343,000, including appropriations for personnel pay and allowance, facilities maintenance, construction, equipment maintenance and other activities.

History

Prominent members

U.S. presidents 

Of the 45 individuals to serve as President of the United States , 33 had military experience. Of those 33, 21 served in the militia or Army National Guard.

 George Washington, commissioned a Major in the Virginia Militia in 1753. He attained the rank of colonel before resigning his commission at the end of the French and Indian War.
 Thomas Jefferson, colonel and commander of the Albemarle County Militia at the start of the American Revolution
 James Madison, colonel in the Orange County Militia at the start of the American Revolution and aide to his father, James Madison, Sr., who was the commander.
 James Monroe, served in the militia while attending the College of William and Mary. After being wounded at the Battle of Trenton while serving in the Continental Army, he returned to Virginia to recruit and lead a regiment as a militia lieutenant colonel, but the regiment was never raised. In 1780 the British invaded Richmond, Virginia, and Jefferson commissioned Monroe as a colonel to command the militia raised in response and act as liaison to the Continental Army in North Carolina.
 Andrew Jackson, commander of the Tennessee Militia as a major general prior to the War of 1812.
 William Henry Harrison, commander of Indiana Territory's militia and Major General of the Kentucky Militia at the start of the War of 1812.
 John Tyler, commanded a company called the Charles City Rifles, part of Virginia's 52nd Regiment, in the War of 1812.
 James Polk, joined the Tennessee Militia as a captain in a cavalry regiment in 1821. He was subsequently appointed a colonel on the staff of Governor William Carroll.
 Millard Fillmore, served as inspector of New York's 47th Brigade with the rank of major. Commanded the Union Continentals, a militia unit raised to perform local service in Buffalo, New York, during the American Civil War.
 Franklin Pierce, appointed aide de camp to Governor Samuel Dinsmoor in 1831. He remained in the militia until 1847 and attained the rank of colonel before becoming a brigadier general in the Army during the Mexican–American War.
 James Buchanan, a member of the Pennsylvania Militia. His dragoon unit took part in the defense of Baltimore, Maryland, during the War of 1812.
 Abraham Lincoln, served in the Illinois Militia during the Black Hawk War. He commanded a company in the 4th Illinois Regiment with the rank of captain from April to May 1832. He was a private in Captain Alexander White's Company from May to June 1832. He served as a private in Captain Jacob Earley's company from June to July 1832.
 Andrew Johnson, served in the Tennessee Militia in the 1830s, and attained the rank of colonel. During the American Civil War he remained loyal to the Union and was appointed Military Governor of Tennessee with the rank of brigadier general.
 Ulysses S. Grant, having left the Army as a captain, at the start of the Civil War he served in the Illinois Militia as aide de camp and mustering officer for Governor Richard Yates. He held these positions until being appointed commander of the 21st Illinois Infantry, which set him on the path to becoming a general and commander of all Union armies.
 Rutherford B. Hayes, joined a militia company in 1846 intending to fight in the Mexican–American War, but resigned because of ill health. Enlisted as a private in a Cincinnati militia company at the start of the Civil War in 1861, and was elected commander with the rank of captain. He was subsequently appointed a major in the 23rd Ohio Infantry, and ended the war as a brigade commander and brevet Major General.
 James A. Garfield, commissioned a lieutenant colonel in the Ohio Militia in 1861, he took part in recruiting and training the 42nd Ohio Infantry Regiment, which he commanded as a colonel. He later served as Chief of Staff for the Army of the Cumberland and received promotion to Major General.
 Chester A. Arthur, became a member of the New York Militia soon after becoming a lawyer. During the Civil War he served on the staff of Governor Edwin D. Morgan as Quartermaster General with the rank of brigadier general. He later served as Morgan's inspector general, responsible for visiting New York's front line units, assessing conditions and recommending improvements.
 Benjamin Harrison, commissioned in the Indiana Militia by Governor Oliver P. Morton to recruit a regiment during the Civil War, he was subsequently appointed a second lieutenant and captain in and then colonel and commander of the 70th Indiana Infantry Regiment. He received the brevet of brigadier general as a commendation of his service, and later commanded a brigade. He also enrolled in the militia again during labor unrest in Indianapolis in 1877.
 William McKinley, joined a volunteer militia company called the Poland Guards at the start of the Civil War. The company was subsequently mustered in as part of the 23rd Ohio Infantry, the same regiment in which President Hayes served. McKinley ended the war as a major and chief of staff for division commander Samuel S. Carroll.
 Theodore Roosevelt, commissioned as a second lieutenant in the 8th New York Infantry Regiment in 1884, he served until 1888 and attained the rank of captain. During the Spanish–American War he was commissioned lieutenant colonel of the 1st United States Volunteer Cavalry, which he later commanded as a colonel. In 2001 a review of his war record led to a posthumous award of the Medal of Honor.
 Harry S. Truman, served in the Missouri Army National Guard from 1905 to 1911, rising to the rank of corporal. During World War I he rejoined and was commissioned a first lieutenant in the 2nd Missouri Field Artillery. This regiment was federalized as the 129th Field Artillery, and Truman commanded Battery D as a captain. He continued to serve in the Army Reserve, retiring as a colonel in 1953.

(Note: President George W. Bush served in the National Guard in the late 1960s and early 1970s, and he was the first Air National Guard member to attain the presidency.)

Units and formations
Deployable Army units are organized as table of organization and equipment (TOE) organizations or modified table of organization and equipment (MTOE) organizations. Non-deployable units, such as a state's joint force headquarters or regional training institutes are administered as table of distribution and allowance (TDA) units.

Commands 
  46th Military Police Command (MI ARNG)
  135th Sustainment Command (Expeditionary) (AL ARNG)
 167th Sustainment Command (Theater) (AL ARNG)
 184th Sustainment Command (Expeditionary) (MS ARNG)
  263rd Army Air and Missile Defense Command (SC ARNG)

Divisions 
In addition to many deployable units which are non-divisional, the Army National Guard's deployable units include eight Infantry divisions. These divisions, their subordinate brigades or brigades with which the divisions have a training oversight relationship, and the states represented by the largest units include:

Army Aviation Magazine wrote on 31 March 2021 that "The ARNG is pressing forward with the Division Alignment for Training   (DIV AFT) effort. The DIV AFT intent is to enhance leader development and training readiness through codified relationships across echelons and states to develop combat capable division formations for large scale combat operations. The Director, ARNG.. recently convened a DIV AFT Initial Planning Conference to clarify unit alignments for all eight ARNG Division Headquarters and synchronize activities that will facilitate unity of effort between Division Headquarters and aligned for training States."
 28th Infantry Division (PA ARNG)
2nd Infantry Brigade Combat Team (PA ARNG)
 56th Stryker Brigade Combat Team (PA ARNG)
 28th Expeditionary Combat Aviation Brigade (PA ARNG)
 29th Infantry Division (VA ARNG)
  30th Armored Brigade Combat Team (NC ARNG)
  53rd Infantry Brigade Combat Team (FL ARNG)
 116th Infantry Brigade Combat Team (VA ARNG)
 29th Combat Aviation Brigade (MD ARNG)
 34th Infantry Division (MN ARNG)
1st Armored Brigade Combat Team (MN ARNG)
 2nd Infantry Brigade Combat Team (IA ARNG)
  32nd Infantry Brigade Combat Team (WI ARNG)
  116th Cavalry Brigade Combat Team (ID ARNG)
 34th Combat Aviation Brigade (MN ARNG)
 35th Infantry Division (KS ARNG)
 33rd Infantry Brigade Combat Team (IL ARNG)
  39th Infantry Brigade Combat Team (AR ARNG)
  45th Infantry Brigade Combat Team (OK ARNG)
 35th Combat Aviation Brigade (MO ARNG)
 36th Infantry Division (TX ARNG)
 56th Infantry Brigade Combat Team (TX ARNG)
 72nd Infantry Brigade Combat Team (TX ARNG)
  155th Armored Brigade Combat Team (MS ARNG)
  256th Infantry Brigade Combat Team (LA ARNG)
 36th Combat Aviation Brigade (TX ARNG)
 38th Infantry Division (IN ARNG)
 37th Infantry Brigade Combat Team (OH ARNG)
  76th Infantry Brigade Combat Team (IN ARNG)
  278th Armored Cavalry Regiment (TN ARNG)
 38th Combat Aviation Brigade (IN ARNG)
 40th Infantry Division (CA ARNG)
 29th Infantry Brigade Combat Team (HI ARNG)
  41st Infantry Brigade Combat Team (OR ARNG)
  79th Infantry Brigade Combat Team (CA ARNG)
  81st Stryker Brigade Combat Team (WA ARNG)
 40th Combat Aviation Brigade (CA ARNG)
 42nd Infantry Division (NY ARNG)
 27th Infantry Brigade Combat Team (NY ARNG)
 44th Infantry Brigade Combat Team (NJ ARNG)
 86th Infantry Brigade Combat Team (VT ARNG)
42nd Combat Aviation Brigade (NY ARNG)

Multifunctional Support Brigades 
The Army National Guard fields 37 multifunctional support brigades.

Maneuver Enhancement Brigades 
  26th Maneuver Enhancement Brigade (MA ARNG)
  55th Maneuver Enhancement Brigade (PA ARNG)
  67th Maneuver Enhancement Brigade (NE ARNG)
  110th Maneuver Enhancement Brigade (MO ARNG)
 130th Maneuver Enhancement Brigade (NC ARNG)
 136th Maneuver Enhancement Brigade (TX ARNG)
 141st Maneuver Enhancement Brigade (ND ARNG)
  149th Maneuver Enhancement Brigade (KY ARNG)
  157th Maneuver Enhancement Brigade (WI ARNG)
 158th Maneuver Enhancement Brigade (AZ ARNG)
 196th Maneuver Enhancement Brigade (SD ARNG)
 204th Maneuver Enhancement Brigade (UT ARNG)
  218th Maneuver Enhancement Brigade (SC ARNG)
 226th Maneuver Enhancement Brigade (AL ARNG)
  404th Maneuver Enhancement Brigade (IL ARNG)
  648th Maneuver Enhancement Brigade (GA ARNG)

Field Artillery Brigades 
  45th Field Artillery Brigade (OK ARNG)
  65th Field Artillery Brigade (UT ARNG)
  115th Field Artillery Brigade (WY ARNG)
  130th Field Artillery Brigade (KS ARNG)
  138th Field Artillery Brigade (KY ARNG)
  142nd Field Artillery Brigade (AR ARNG)
  169th Field Artillery Brigade (CO ARNG)
  197th Field Artillery Brigade (NH ARNG)

Sustainment Brigades 
  17th Sustainment Brigade (NV ARNG)
 36th Sustainment Brigade (TX ARNG)
  38th Sustainment Brigade (IN ARNG)
  108th Sustainment Brigade (IL ARNG)
  111th Sustainment Brigade (NM ARNG)
  113th Sustainment Brigade (NC ARNG)
  224th Sustainment Brigade (CA ARNG)
  230th Sustainment Brigade (TN ARNG)
  369th Sustainment Brigade (NY ARNG)
  371st Sustainment Brigade (OH ARNG)

Military Intelligence Brigades 
  58th Military Intelligence Brigade (Expeditionary) (MD ARNG)
  71st Military Intelligence Brigade (Expeditionary) (TX ARNG)
  300th Military Intelligence Brigade (Linguist) (UT ARNG) (TDA organization)

Functional Support Brigades and Groups

Engineer Brigades 
  16th Engineer Brigade (OH ARNG)
  35th Engineer Brigade (MO ARNG)
  111th Engineer Brigade (WV ARNG)
 117th Engineer Brigade (SC ARNG)
  168th Engineer Brigade (MS ARNG)
 176th Engineer Brigade (TX ARNG)
  194th Engineer Brigade (TN ARNG)
  219th Engineer Brigade (IN ARNG)
  225th Engineer Brigade (LA ARNG)

Air Defense Artillery Brigades 
  164th Air Defense Artillery Brigade (FL ARNG)
  174th Air Defense Artillery Brigade (OH ARNG)
  678th Air Defense Artillery Brigade (SC ARNG)

Theater Tactical Signal Brigades 
 228th Theater Tactical Signal Brigade (SC ARNG)
  261st Theater Tactical Signal Brigade (DE ARNG)

Military Police Brigades 
 35th Military Police Brigade (MO ARNG)
 43rd Military Police Brigade (RI ARNG)
  49th Military Police Brigade (CA ARNG)
 92nd Military Police Brigade (PR ARNG)
142nd Military Police Brigade (AL ARNG)
  177th Military Police Brigade (MI ARNG)

Theater and Combat Aviation Brigades 
  63rd Theater Aviation Brigade (KY ARNG)
  77th Combat Aviation Brigade (AR ARNG)
  185th Theater Aviation Brigade (MS ARNG)
 449th Combat Aviation Brigade (NC ARNG)

Other brigades 
 31st Chemical Brigade (AL ARNG)
 91st Cyber Brigade (VA ARNG) (TDA organization)
  100th Missile Defense Brigade (CO ARNG)

Other Groups 
  19th Special Forces Group (UT ARNG)
  20th Special Forces Group (AL ARNG)
 111th Explosive Ordnance Disposal Group (AL ARNG)
 56th Theater Information Operations Group (WA ARNG)
 71st Theater Information Operations Group (TX ARNG)
 204th Theater Aviation Operations Group (LA ARNG)
 1100th Theater Aviation Sustainment Maintenance Group (MD ARNG)
 1106th Theater Aviation Sustainment Maintenance Group (CA ARNG)
 1107th Theater Aviation Sustainment Maintenance Group (MO ARNG)
 1108th Theater Aviation Sustainment Maintenance Group (MS ARNG)
 1109th Theater Aviation Sustainment Maintenance Group (CT ARNG)
 42nd Regional Support Group (NJ ARNG)
 50th Regional Support Group (FL ARNG)
 109th Regional Support Group (SD ARNG)
 115th Regional Support Group (CA ARNG)
 120th Regional Support Group (ME ARNG)
 139th Regional Support Group (LA ARNG)
 143rd Regional Support Group (CT ARNG)
 151st Regional Support Group (MA ARNG)
 191st Regional Support Group (PR ARNG)
 198th Regional Support Group (AZ ARNG)
 201st Regional Support Group (GA ARNG)
 213th Regional Support Group (PA ARNG)
 272nd Regional Support Group (MI ARNG)
 297th Regional Support Group (AK ARNG)
 329th Regional Support Group (VA ARNG)
 347th Regional Support Group (MN ARNG)
 635th Regional Support Group (KS ARNG)
 734th Regional Support Group (IA ARNG)
 1889th Regional Support Group (MT ARNG)

Regular Army – Army National Guard Partnership 
In 2016, the Army and the Army National Guard began a training and readiness initiative that aligned some Army brigades with National Guard division headquarters, and some National Guard brigades with Army division headquarters. Among others, this program included the National Guard's 86th Infantry Brigade Combat Team becoming affiliated with the Army's 10th Mountain Division and the National Guard's 1st Battalion, 143rd Infantry Regiment affiliating with the Army's 173rd Airborne Brigade Combat Team. In addition, 3rd Brigade Combat Team, 10th Mountain Division began an affiliation with the National Guard's 36th Infantry Division.

 48th Infantry Brigade Combat Team (GA ARNG), associated with  3rd Infantry Division
 81st Stryker Brigade Combat Team (WA ARNG), associated with  7th Infantry Division
 86th Infantry Brigade Combat Team (VT ARNG), associated with  10th Mountain Division
 1st Battalion (Airborne), 143rd Infantry Regiment (TX ARNG), associated with  173rd Airborne Brigade Combat Team
 1st Battalion, 151st Infantry Regiment (IN ARNG), associated with 2nd Brigade Combat Team, 25th Infantry Division
 840th Engineer Company (TX ARNG), associated with  36th Engineer Brigade
 249th Transportation Company (TX ARNG), associated with 1st Cavalry Division Sustainment Brigade
 1176th Transportation Company (TN ARNG), associated with  101st Sustainment Brigade
 1245th Transportation Company (OK ARNG), associated with  1st Cavalry Division Sustainment Brigade
 2123rd Transportation Company (KY ARNG), associated with  101st Sustainment Brigade

Army units partnering with Army National Guard headquarters include:

5th Engineer Battalion, associated with  35th Engineer Brigade (MO ARNG).

By state

The Army and Air National Guard in each state are headed by the State Adjutant General.  The Adjutant General (TAG) is the de facto commander of a state's military forces, and reports to the state governor.

Legacy units and formations

Several units have been affected by Army National Guard reorganizations.  Some have been renamed or inactivated.  Some have had subordinate units reallocated to other commands.  A partial list of inactivated major units includes:

 26th Infantry Division, inactivated 1 September 1993.
 27th Infantry Division, reorganized as 27th Armored Division, 1 February 1955. (See below.)
 27th Armored Division, inactivated 1 February 1968.
 30th Armored Division, inactivated 1 December 1973. (See below.)
 30th Infantry Division, inactivated 4 January 1974.
 31st Infantry Division, inactivated 14 January 1968.  Units allocated to 30th Armored Division.
 32nd Infantry Division, inactivated 1 December 1967.
 33rd Infantry Division, inactivated 1 February 1968.
 37th Infantry Division, inactivated 15 February 1968.
 39th Infantry Division, inactivated 1 December 1967.
 40th Armored Division, inactivated 29 January 1968.
 41st Infantry Division, inactivated 1 January 1968.
 43rd Infantry Division, inactivated 16 December 1967.
 44th Infantry Division, inactivated 10 October 1954.
 45th Infantry Division, inactivated 1 February 1968.
 46th Infantry Division, inactivated 1 February 1968.
 47th Infantry Division, inactivated 10 February 1991.
 48th Armored Division, inactivated 29 January 1968.
 49th Armored Division, inactivated 1 May 2004; reflagged as the 36th Infantry Division.
 50th Armored Division, inactivated 1 September 1993.

Leadership 

Upon the creation of the United States Air Force in 1947, the National Guard Bureau was organized into two divisions; Army National Guard and Air National Guard. Each were headed by a major general who reported to the chief of the National Guard Bureau. The head of the Army National Guard was originally established as the chief of the Army Division at the National Guard Bureau. The position was downgraded to brigadier general in 1962 due to force reduction. It was renamed to Director of the Army National Guard and elevated back to major general in 1970. The position was later elevated to the rank of lieutenant general in 2001. The Army National Guard is also authorized a deputy director which was originally established as a brigadier general office in 1970. It was elevated to the rank of major general in 2006.

The director of the Army National Guard oversees a staff which aids in planning and day-to-day organization and management.  In addition to a chief of staff, the Director's staff includes several special staff members, including a chaplain and protocol and awards specialists.  It also includes a primary staff, which is organized as directorates, divisions, and branches.  The directorates of the Army National Guard staff are arranged along the lines of a typical American military staff: G-1 for personnel; G-2 for intelligence; G-3 for plans, operations and training; G-4 for logistics; G-5 for strategic plans, policy and communications; G-6 for communications; and G-8 for budgets and financial management.

List of chiefs and directors

See also
 National Guard (United States)
 Space National Guard
 19th Special Forces Group
 20th Special Forces Group
Comparable organizations
United States Army Reserve
United States Marine Corps Reserve
United States Navy Reserve
United States Coast Guard Reserve
Air National Guard (U.S. Air Force)
Air Force Reserve Command (U.S. Air Force)

Notes

References

External links

 
Army National Guard News
Unit Designations in the Army Modular Force, accessed 23 November 2006
National Guard Maneuver Enhancement Brigade's Role in Domestic Missions
Guard Knowledge Online
Army National Guard Old Website

National Guard (United States)
 
Articles containing video clips
1903 establishments in the United States
Military units and formations established in 1903